Nigoro-buna, sometimes called round crucian carp, is a type of wild goldfish (Carassius auratus grandoculis) or related cyprinid (Carassius buergeri grandoculis) endemic to Japan. Its habitat is limited to Lake Biwa, its tributaries and distributaries, and irrigation canals, in the Shiga Prefecture (west-central Honshu), northeast of Kyoto.

The fish is of culinary importance locally in Shiga Prefecture, where it is used as an ingredient for funazushi, a type of narezushi. The fermented fish is closely packed with rice and salt in tubs.

Etymology
The Japanese name  has been ascribed various etymologies. It is alternatively styled nigorobuna , which crudely translates to "braising-timely-carp".

Taxonomy
Some literature refer to nigorobuna as subspecies Carassius auratus grandoculis,<ref>e.g., Fujioka, Y. (1997). Production and some properties of gynogenetic diploids in nigorobuna crassius carassius grandoculi, Bull. Shiga. Prefect. Fis. Exp. Stn. 46, 108, cited by Arai, Katsutoshi (2001) Genetic improvement of aqualculture finfish species by chromosome manipulation techniques in Japan".</ref>

It is also given as subspecies Carassius buergeri grandoculis in governmental and academic literature as well as the Japanese database. The subspecies exhibits polyploidy.

 Morphology 
A typical adult nigorobuna attains length at maturity.

Its shape resembles the  that populate Lake Suwa; its body depth is short, and breadth is wide.

The head is large, with a ventricular contour that is characteristically ridged. The mouth slit is slanted upwards. Around 61 (or 52–72) gill rakers can be counted, and the dorsal fin rays consist of one spine and 17 (or 15 to 18) soft rays. The anal fin has one spine and five soft rays. The basal length of the dorsal fin is rather long.  The total length is 2.7× the body depth.

 Behavior 
Larvae and juveniles are found on the surface and medium depths entrenched within reeds around the lake, in other words, inlets rich in aquatic plants. Adults occupy shallower waters in summer and move to deeper waters during the cold winter.

One study showed that when larvae of about 1 cm length were compared, nigorobuna was "scarce(ly)" feeding on algae, compared with local genogoro-buna, which had 25–50% algal digestive tract content by bulk. The fish showed a preference for certain water fleas over another, relying heavily on Chydorus spp. and to a lesser extent on Mesocyclops. By contrast, the gengoro-buna kept in the same enclosure preferred rotifer spp. The fry (larvae) of both species largely ignored other types of zooplankton (such as Alona, Scapholeberis, and copepodid larvae) which were plentiful. As they grow into juveniles exceeding 1 cm, the nigorobuna begin pecking at aquatic plants to feed on attached algae, so by the time they attain 2 cm lengths, algae account for half their diet (and rotifers represent a small percentage). When they grow larger, they capture somewhat bottom-dwelling zooplankton.

Adults spawn from April to June, laying eggs on aquatic plants when water levels rise due to the rainy season. The hatchlings live by the reedy shore, and move offshore as they grow, reaching full size in 2 to 3 years.

Uses

This is a highly prized fish commercially, made into funazushi, where whole fish are salted and fermented in beds of cooked rice. An authentic funazushi traditionally must use the "round crucian carp", and for this reason it has been dubbed sushi-buna meaning "the crucian carp for sushi". The dish, a type of narezushi, is a local delicacy of Shiga Prefecture, and known for its pungent odor.

This species is said to make superior funazushi that is tender down to the bones, in contrast to imitations made by using gengoro-buna (Carassius cuvieri) as a substitute. The ginbuna (Carassius langsdorfii) is also said to be used as a substitute.

 Fishing regulations 
The annual catch was estimated to be 500 tons in 1965, fell to 178 tons by 1989, and drastically down to 18 tons by 1997 so that efforts were begun to release fishery-raised spawn into nearby rice paddies connected with the water system. Nowadays, the species is also farmed in Saitama Prefecture.

Shiga Prefecture, in its announced project to recover the fish stock, promulgated rules through its Lake Biwa Fisheries Management Commission, effective April 1, 2007, prohibiting the capture of fish measuring 22 cm or less.

 Vulnerability 
The Japanese Ministry of the Environment's published Red List (2018) listed the fish subspecies as endangered (IB).

The devastation of numbers is blamed on habitat loss (spawning ground), as well predation by introduced species. Adults are known to be taken by black bass, and the larvae and eggs are fed on by bluegill, both of which have become invasive in the Lake.
 
The impact of predatory fish may be a secondary aggravating factor, the core cause being man-made changes to the lake's landscape according to some opinion.

Also the canals connecting the bodies of water were fitted with sluice gates, hampering the fish from traveling.

Explanatory notes

References

Bibliography 

  

 
 
 

Goldfish
Carassius
Fish of Japan
Freshwater fish of Japan
Fish of East Asia